Prostitution in Ghana is illegal but widespread, so much so that many Ghanaians are unaware that it is prohibited. There are growing sex tourism, child prostitution and human trafficking. High rates of unemployment and poverty in Ghana are believed to be causing a drastic growth in the sex industry. Unemployment is a reason the teenage engage in sex trade. A high percentage of sex workers are vulnerable to HIV.

Some prostitutes in Ghana are campaigning for the sex trade to be legalised, and discussions have taken place.

Ghana's former Prime Minister, Dr Kofi Abrefa Busia, an Oxford sociologist, wrote a thesis on prostitution “Report on a social survey of Sekondi-Takoradi.“

Overview
Prostitutes in Ghana are known locally as "ashawo", "toutou" (derived from 'two shillings, two pence'; a prostitute who doesn't charge much) or "maame-i-dey".
There are brothels in most Ghana towns, cities and ports. Often these are in makeshift shacks or old warehouses, and some are attached to bars. Prostitutes not working in the brothels are known as either "seaters" or "roamers". The seaters work from home, sitting in the doorway and inviting customers in. When they are with a customer they lower a curtain in front of the door. Seaters generally work in one area of town, creating a small red-light district. Generally they are older women or widows.

Roamers tend to be younger women and work on the streets, bars and hotels. "Pilots", often taxi-drivers, work as intermediaries between the women and clients in hotels. They usually get a fee from both parties. They also help the women get into the hotels as most have a no single women rule. Hotel staff may also take bribes to let the women in.

The women face occasional violence from the customers, or more commonly refusal to pay. Hotel staff may exploit them.

Since oil production started in 2011, prostitution in the port of Takoradi has risen sharply due to the influx of oil workers.

UNAIDS estimate there are 52,000 prostitutes in the country.

Male prostitution
The prevalence of male prostitution in Ghana has slowly risen over the years but not much is said about it because of the form it takes. Male prostitution is predominant in the following areas such as Tesano, Adabraka, Osu, Accra and Paloma in Accra. Male prostitutes go undercover as women because homosexuality is illegal in Ghana as per the constitution. The activities of these prostitutes are most commonly patronized by men in the elite class who have enough resources to be discreet about their sexual activities. This leads to a relevant increase in the price of engaging homosexual prostitutes given the limited supply of these prostitutes.

Law enforcement
Law enforcement is variable, and there are also occasional crack-downs on prostitutes. Prostitutes are often abused by law enforcement officers. In a survey across 26 town and cities, a third of the prostitutes told of problems with the police. These included intimidation, extortion, threats and raids. Many reported that they had had to have sex with the officers to avoid prosecution.

In a 2007 survey of 251 law enforcement agents, 15% admitted they had demanded sex in return for not prosecuting arrested prostitutes.

Police and politicians are sometimes bribed or blackmailed to turn a blind eye.

Sex tourism
Ghana has established itself as a destination for sex tourism from western tourists. This kind of tourism has attracted paedophiles due to the country's lax child protection laws and poor law enforcement. Child prostitution is increasing is a problem with girls being vulnerable and boys to a lesser extent.

Sex trafficking

Vietnamese prostitutes have been found in Ghana in the coastal cities of Tema and Takoradi. Ghanaian investigative journalist Anas Aremeyaw Anas discovered that the Vietnamese women had been trafficked into Ghana for the purposes of prostitution. The Vietnamese prostitutes had been recruited by a Vietnamese woman named Hanh in July 2013. The prostitutes worked from a brothel in the Jang Mi Guest House in Takoradi. The women's ages ranged from 25 to 35.

Women and girls from China, Nigeria, Côte d'Ivoire and Burkina Faso are also trafficked into Ghana for prostitution.

The United States Department of State Office to Monitor and Combat Trafficking in Persons ranks Ghana as a 'Tier 2' country.

See also
 Prostitution in Africa

References

Ghana
Society of Ghana
Ghana